Thinking Space may refer to:
 Thinking Space, an information mapping application, see Mindjet#Company history
 Thinking Space, a book by Mike Crang